Belomortsi Point (‘Nos Belomortsi’ \'nos be-lo-'mor-tsi\) is the sharp and low ice-free point projecting 140 m northwestwards from Gerlovo Beach on Ioannes Paulus II Peninsula, Livingston Island in Antarctica. The feature is named after the settlement of Belomortsi in Northeastern Bulgaria.

Location
British mapping in 1968, and Bulgarian in 2005, 2009 and 2017.

Maps
 L.L. Ivanov et al. Antarctica: Livingston Island and Greenwich Island, South Shetland Islands. Scale 1:100000 topographic map. Sofia: Antarctic Place-names Commission of Bulgaria, 2005.
 L.L. Ivanov. Antarctica: Livingston Island and Greenwich, Robert, Snow and Smith Islands. Scale 1:120000 topographic map.  Troyan: Manfred Wörner Foundation, 2009.
 Antarctic Digital Database (ADD). Scale 1:250000 topographic map of Antarctica. Scientific Committee on Antarctic Research (SCAR). Since 1993, regularly upgraded and updated

References
 Bulgarian Antarctic Gazetteer. Antarctic Place-names Commission. (details in Bulgarian, basic data in English)
 Belomortsi Point. SCAR Composite Gazetteer of Antarctica

External links
 Belomortsi Point. Copernix satellite image

Headlands of Livingston Island
Bulgaria and the Antarctic